Avis Stearns Van Wagenen (January 1, 1841 - January 3, 1907) was a partner in E. C. Stearns & Company, a hardware business, with her brother, Edward C. Stearns in the late 19th century in Syracuse, New York.

Bibliography
 Genealogy and memoirs of Isaac Stearns and his descendants - by Avis Stearns Van Wagenen 10 issues published between 1901 and 1998 in English.
  Stearns genealogy and memoirs, Volume 2 - by Avis Stearns Van Wagenen 1 edition published in 1901 in English.
 Genealogy and memoirs of Charles and Nathaniel Stearns, and their descendents - by Avis Stearns Van Wagenen 5 editions published between 1901 and 1982 in English.
 Sarah Bernhardt - by Avis Stearns Van Wagenen 1 edition published in 1899 in English.
 Stearns Family - by Avis Stearns Van Wagenen 1 edition published in 1955 in English.

References

External links
 
 A Complement to Genealogies in the Library of Congress: A Bibliography, pg.889 - Library of Congress - Magna Charta Book Company, 1981
 Daughters of the American Revolution magazine, Volumes 43-45, pg.183 - July 1913
 Memorial history of Syracuse, N.Y., from its settlement to the present time - Dwight Hall Bruce, Electronic Library, pg.649

1841 births
1907 deaths
Businesspeople from Syracuse, New York
19th-century American businesspeople